Harold Geoffrey Owen Owen-Smith (18 February 1909 – 28 February 1990), known as Tuppy Smith, was a South African cricketer who played Test cricket for South Africa and a rugby player who played for and captained the England rugby union team. He was born in Rondebosch, Cape Town, and died at Rosebank, also in Cape Town.

Early life
Owen-Smith was educated at Diocesan College in Rondebosch and attended the University of Cape Town. An all-round athlete, he represented his school and university in cricket and rugby amongst other sports.

Career
Owen-Smith played cricket in 5 Tests in 1929 for South Africa, all during the tour of England, and was named Wisden Cricketer of the Year in 1930.

He was capped 10 times in rugby union by England from 1934 to 1937. He was captain throughout the 1937 Home Nations Championship, so he captained England three times. He is regarded as having been a fine attacking full-back and a great of the game. He also gained awards in boxing and athletics whilst at university in England. He played one match for Leicester Tigers against Waterloo F.C. in 1933.

Medical career
Owen-Smith studied medicine at Magdalen College, Oxford, on a Rhodes Scholarship and qualified as a physician at St Mary's Hospital Medical School. While at Oxford, he continued playing rugby and cricket for his university. After completing his degree he went back to South Africa and was a long-serving and much loved general practitioner, largely working from his home in Rondebosch.

Family
His son, Michael Owen-Smith, is a South African journalist who served as the media manager for Cricket South Africa from 2007 to 2010.

References

External links

1909 births
1990 deaths
Alumni of Diocesan College, Cape Town
Alumni of Magdalen College, Oxford
Alumni of St Mary's Hospital Medical School
England international rugby union players
Gentlemen cricketers
H. D. G. Leveson Gower's XI cricketers
Marylebone Cricket Club cricketers
Middlesex cricketers
Oxford University cricketers
Oxford University RFC players
People from Rondebosch
Physicians of St Mary's Hospital, London
Rugby union players from Cape Town
South Africa Test cricketers
South African cricketers
South African general practitioners
South African rugby union players
Western Province cricketers
Wisden Cricketers of the Year
Leicester Tigers players
Hampshire County RFU players